Wolfrando Lavalan Jr. (November 25, 1957 – March 29, 2022), professionally known as Jun Lopito, was a Filipino guitarist. He worked with most of the Philippines' rock bands and singers such as Pinoy rock legend Pepe Smith and ethnic singer Grace Nono.

Early life

Born as Wolfrando Lavalan Jr., Jun Lopito was the son of Wolfrando Lavalan Sr. better known as "Lopito", a comedian and the original Filipino TV host of Tawag ng Tanghalan in the 1950s. Jun at the age of 8 was caught up in music after seeing The Beatles in concert in 1966. At the age of 17, he played blues and rock. In 1979, the alternative rock and blues band The Jerks was formed and he joined later in the year.

Career
In 1976, Joey Smith of the Pinoy rock band Juan dela Cruz during its hiatus formed the band The Airwaves. The band The Jerks was formed in 1979 and Lopito joined as a guitarist and left the band in the 90s. The album Bodhisattvas was released in 1995 as his first solo album on which he composed four of the eleven songs.

Death
Jun died on March 29, 2022 at the age of 64.

Awards

References

External links
 
 

1957 births
2022 deaths
Filipino rock guitarists
Place of birth missing
20th-century guitarists
21st-century guitarists
20th-century Filipino musicians
21st-century Filipino musicians
20th-century male musicians
21st-century male musicians